What's New, Pussycat? is Yukari Tamura's first mini album, released on September 26, 1997, as her debut. The album is no longer being printed and is highly sought after by Yukari Tamura's fans.

Track listing
 Happy Birthday
 Lyrics: Kakeru Saegusa
 Arrangement and composition: Kazuhisa Yamaguchi

 Lyrics: Kakeru Saegusa
 Arrangement and composition: Kazuhisa Yamaguchi
 Love me do
 Lyrics: Kakeru Saegusa
 Arrangement and composition: Kazuhisa Yamaguchi

 Lyrics: Kakeru Saegusa
 Arrangement and composition: Kazuhisa Yamaguchi
 Sparkle with delight
 Lyrics: Kakeru Saegusa
 Arrangement and composition: Kazuhisa Yamaguchi

 Lyrics: Kakeru Saegusa
 Arrangement and composition: Kazuhisa Yamaguchi

References

1997 debut albums
Yukari Tamura albums
Universal Music Japan albums